Godfrey III may refer to:

 Godfrey III, Duke of Lower Lorraine (c. 997–1069)
 Godfrey III, Count of Louvain (1142–1190)